Bolivar Municipal Airport  is a city-owned public-use airport located four nautical miles (4.6 mi, 7.4 km) east of the central business district of Bolivar, a city in Polk County, Missouri, United States. It is included in the FAA's National Plan of Integrated Airport Systems for 2011–2015, which categorized it as a general aviation facility.

History 
By proclamation of the mayor of the city of Bolivar the field was renamed "Bolivar Municipal Airport, Gene Engledow Field" on October 12, 2013.
The renaming was to honor Gene Engledow, a local 100-year-old master pilot. Engledow has been licensed by the FAA for 77 years as of 2013

Facilities and aircraft 
It has one runway designated 18/36 with an asphalt surface measuring 4,000 by 75 feet (1,219 x 23 m).

For the 12-month period ending May 30, 2011, the airport had 18,701 aircraft operations, an average of 51 per day: 96% general aviation, 2% air taxi, 2% military. As of October 17, 2013 there were 51 aircraft based at this airport: 45 single-engine (88%),2 multi-engine (4%), 3 jet (6%) and 1 helicopter (2%).

On October 10, 2011 S.O.A.R. (Service Oriented Aviation Readiness) began service as the FBO.

References

External links 
 S.O.A.R, the fixed-base operator
  at MoDOT Airport Directory
 Aerial photo as of 10 March 1996 from USGS The National Map
 
 

Airports in Missouri
Buildings and structures in Polk County, Missouri